Vemulawada is an ancient historical and a famous pilgrimage census town in Rajanna Sircilla district of the Indian state of Telangana. It is the headquarters of Vemulawada Mandal and Revenue Division. The place is notable for Sri Raja Rajeswara Swamy temple, constructed between 760 and 973 CE, and a site of pilgrimage for Hindu worshipers. It also has ancient temples of Bheemeswara, Nagareswara and Pochamma nearby the main temple of Sri Raja Rajeswara Swamy. It was the capital of Vemulawada Chalukyas, that ruled present day Telangana, parts of Andhra Pradesh, Karnataka and Maharashtra between 7 and 10 century CE. The town attracts large number of pilgrims from South India as well as Maharashtra, Odisha and Chhattisgarh. Huge number of devotees throng the place during Maha Shivaratri and Sri Rama Navami. The famous floral festival of Telangana, Bathukamma is believed to have originated from this place.

Transport

Railway
Vemulawada will be connected to Hyderabad and Karimnagar via the new Kothapalli-Manoharabad railway line. The line is expected to be completed in 2025. Also to be a part of the railway line are nearby Sircilla, Siddipet, Gajwel, etc.

See also 
 Chalukyas of Vemulavada
 Malliya Rechana
 Vemulawada Bheemakavi

References 

Census towns in Rajanna Sircilla